Setques is a commune in the Pas-de-Calais department in the Hauts-de-France region of France.

Geography
Setques is located some 8 miles (13 km) southwest of Saint-Omer, at the junction of the D211 and D342 roads, in the valley of the Aa river.  Junction 3 of the A26 autoroute is only a mile away.

Population

Places of interest
 The church of St.Omer, dating from the eighteenth century.

See also
Communes of the Pas-de-Calais department

References

Communes of Pas-de-Calais